is a Japanese football player who plays as Goalkeeper and currently play for FC Imabari.

Career
After growing for eight years in Kashiwa Reysol youth ranks, Takimoto was promoted to the top team in 2016.

Club statistics
Updated to end of 2018 season.

References

External links

Profile at Kashiwa Reysol
Profile at FC Imabari
Profile at J. League
Official Twitter profile

1997 births
Living people
Association football people from Ibaraki Prefecture
Japanese footballers
J1 League players
J2 League players
Kashiwa Reysol players
Association football goalkeepers